Gaius Julius Silanus was a Roman senator and general who held a series of offices in the emperor's service. He was suffect consul for the nundinium of January to April 92 as the colleague of Quintus Junius Arulenus Rusticus. Silanus is known solely through inscriptions.

Ronald Syme speculates Silanus came from Tres Galliae, and adds that "the cognomen need have nothing to do with the aristocratic Junii Silani." He was co-opted into the Arval Brethren on 22 January 86 to replace the recently deceased Gaius Vipstanus Apronianus. While he was appointed magister in the year 87, he was absent from the records of the sodales for the rest of that year, and again from 89 to 91; Syme speculates Silanus was absent due to imperial appointment either to command a legion or to govern one of the eight imperial praetorian provinces.

References

Suffect consuls of Imperial Rome
Silanus
1st-century Romans